Prasenjit is a given name of Sanskrit origin. It may refer to:

 Prasenajit (Pasenadi in Pali), an ancient king of Kosala in present-day India
 Prasenjit Biswas, Indian academic
 Prasenjit Duara, Indian-origin historian
 Prasenjit Ganguly, Indian cricketer
 Prasenjit Ghosh or Prosenjit Ghosh, Indian footballer
 Prasenjit Sen, Indian academic
 Prosenjit Chatterjee, Indian film actor and producer